Guaymaral Airport  is a high-elevation airport in the north of Bogotá, Colombia, also serving the towns of Cota and Chía.

Overview
The airport primarily handles general aviation, flight school and executive flights traffic. It is the base for private and commercial pilot training schools Aeroandes and Aeroclub de Colombia. There are hills east and west of the airport. The parallel grass Runway 11R/29L is the longer, but is unmarked.

See also
Transport in Colombia
List of airports in Colombia

References

External links
OurAirports - Guaymaral

Airports in Colombia
Transport in Bogotá
Buildings and structures in Cundinamarca Department